The first School of Fine Arts was established in 1908 in Cairo. Established college in Alexandria in 1957. And its founder, the late Prof. Dr. / Ahmed Osman . One of the pioneers of contemporary sculpture and its first dean . The study aims at the college to prepare and graduate cadres specialized in the fields of Fine Creation through disciplines Departments five : (Architecture - Decoration - Printmaking - Painting - Sculpture) .

In 1962 the first batch of students was  graduated after obtaining a bachelor's degree in section of arts. In 1964 the first batch of students was graduated after obtaining a bachelor's degree in architecture. In 1975, Helwan University Was established, and included Faculty of Fine Arts . a Presidential Decree No 361 was Issued in 1989 to include Faculty of Fine Arts to University of Alexandria

Objectives 
Faculty of Fine Arts at Alexandria University applies quality systems in order to provide a graduate reaches to excellence in the areas of research and
artistic and plastic creativity, and it shall contribute effectively in community service and environment development to obtain accreditation.

•  Prepare creative artist who has renewable vision and creative awareness pulsating with current facts.

•  Prepare innovative designer in the field of environmental design and visual communication in various fields (Urban Planning Civil, environmental architecture, architectural heritage and problems of industrial development in the environment .....Etc.) so that he can align the developed needs of man and society in the fields of economy, trade, 
environment and culture, and it is achieved through by providing 
knowledge and liberating imagination and the acquisition of necessary technical and performance skills.

• Prepare specialists in the fields of architecture, arts that development programs require.

• Raise the level of professional and scientific workers in the fields of architecture and arts.

•  Conduct research and studies in various areas of specialization in the faculty.

• Exchange of experiences and information with other Egyptian, Arab and international educational and cultural institutions.

•  Provide technical advice in various areas of specialization and contribute to the development and modernization of thought and practices in the areas 
of faculty work to serve environment and community.

In order to achieve that, the faculty concerns about the resurgence of great traditions of Ancient, Coptic and Islamic Egyptian heritage in architecture and arts. The faculty also deliberates other cultures contributing in the human heritage and to do that it requires continued programs to achieve coherence between the academic activity of the faculty and programs of other local and international universities. The mainstay of progress in this field depends on participation and opening up to discovery and experimentation.

Departments 
 Architecture
 Decoration
 Graphic
 Painting
 Sculpture

Study Duration 
A study for taking bachelor's degree takes five years including private preparatory year in Architecture Department,a Preparatory year in Decoration Department and Preparatory year in Arts Department to qualify to join these sections (Printmaking - Painting - Sculpture)

Faculty Buildings 
Faculty Departments are divided among four buildings divided over four locations as follows: 
 The main building: Which is the headquarters of the faculty and is located in the (108  Abdel Salam Aref Mazloum)  and it included  Dean's  Office, prof.dr./ vice dean for student's affairs and Education office, Prof. Dr. Vice Dean for Graduate Studies and Research office, administration departments, also includes Architecture Department and Sculpture Department.
 Gelim  Building: located in (64 Mustafa Fahmy - gelim) which includes Printmaking Department.
 Janaklis  Building: located in (625 tareek el horreya). It includes Painting Department, And Prof. Dr. / Vice Dean for Community Service and environment development office.
 Omar Tosson Pasha  building: located in (9 el ezaa st.) and includes Decoration Department, Wall Painting and preparatory arts.

Heads of Departments 
prof.dr Sahar Al-Arnaouty - head of Architecture Department

Prof.dr Mahmoud Hassan Mallah - head of  Decoration Department

Prof.dr Azza Mohamed Abu Al-Saud - head of Printmaking Department

Prof.dr Afaf Khalil el abd - head of Photography Department

Prof.dr samir abd el latif Shushan - head of Sculpture department

Prof.dr Darwish Barrawy - scientific coordinator for  Preparatory general Arts

Jubilee 
Fifty years since the establishing Faculty of Fine Arts, Alexandria 
University. The faculty has been supplying the society with faculty artists and architectures who enriched the culture and still the pioneers play a vital role in the Egyptian, Arab and international art movement.

In 2007, the faculty celebrated its golden jubilee for its foundation. The celebration included:

First Art & Architecture Exhibitions:

• Exhibition of graduation projects for the year 2005-2006, at Hussin Sobhy Museum.

• Exhibition of faculty new buildings in El Maamora, in Faculty Museum in the Main Hall-Mazlom.

• Exhibition of 2000's generation, at Faculty Museum in the Main Hall-Mazlom.

• Exhibition of 90's generation, at Faculty Museum in the Main Hall-Mazlom.

• Exhibition of 80's generation, at Faculty Museum in the Main Hall-Mazlom.

• Exhibition of 70's generation, at Faculty Museum in the Main Hall-Mazlom.

• Exhibition of 60's generation, at Faculty Museum in the Main Hall-Mazlom.

• Exhibition of art workshops (photography-printed designs-sculpture-Decor-architecture), in Hall of Creation center- Al Horria Road.

• Exhibition of architecture workshops in participation with Darmstadt University-Germany, in Hall of Creation center- Al Horria Road.

Second: Workshops

 • Art workshops held in City Landscape Center in Moharram Bek.

•  Architecture joint workshops between Architecture Department of the faculty and Architecture Department in Darmstadt University-Germany on environment architecture. The workshops were held in Cairo, Alexandria and Siwa and German Institute of Gutta in Alexandria participated.

Third: Memorial Book

It is a memorial book on faculty celebration of the golden jubilee

Fourth: Documentary film of the jubilee

It is a documentary on faculty role and pioneers in art and architecture 
movement and its effect on Alexandria during this period.

Fifth: Scientific Conference

It was announced for the Third Scientific Conference as an activity of the golden jubilee celebration. The conference date was defined on 30 April 2007. The Minister of Education, Dr. Yousry El Gamal and a group of government officials, teaching staff and students had attended the conference

References

Alexandria University